Richard Charles Margison, OC (born 16 July 1953) is a Canadian operatic tenor and lives in Stouffville, Ontario, Canada.

Background
Margison began his career in Victoria, BC, where, he sang folk songs in the coffeehouses and clubs. He appeared on CBC's Search for the Stars in 1981.

Highlands Opera Studio
In 2007, Margison and opera director Valerie Kuinka, founded the Highlands Opera Studio, a training program for emerging operatic professionals.

Honours
Margison was named an Officer of the Order of Canada in 2001 and was inducted into the Canadian Opera Hall of Fame in 2003.  Margison received the Queen Elizabeth II Golden Jubilee Medal in 2002 and Queen Elizabeth II Diamond Jubilee Medal in 2012.

References

External links 
Profile of Richard Margison at Highland Opera Studio
Richard Margison at The Canadian Encyclopedia

1953 births
Living people
Officers of the Order of Canada
Canadian operatic tenors
Musicians from Victoria, British Columbia
Fellows of the Royal Conservatory of Music
20th-century Canadian male opera singers
21st-century Canadian male opera singers